Carentan is a small rural town near the north-eastern base of the French Cotentin Peninsula in Normandy in north-western France, with a population of about 6,000. It is a former commune in the Manche department. On 1 January 2016, it was merged into the new commune of Carentan-les-Marais. The town was a strategic early goal of the World War II landings as capturing the town was necessary to link the lodgements at Utah and Omaha beaches which were divided by the Douve river estuary (nearby fields were flooded by the Germans up to the town's outskirts). The town was also needed as an intermediate staging position for the capture of the cities of Cherbourg and Octeville, with the critically important port facilities in Cherbourg.

History
Carentan is close to the sites of the medieval Battle of Formigny of the Hundred Years' War. The town is also likely the site of the historical references to the ancient Gallic port (documented by Roman sources) as Crociatonum a possession of the Unelli (or Veneli or also Venelli) tribe (Greek: Οὐένελοι) as it is situated on the river Douve slightly inland from the beaches at Normandy—geographically, such gentle terrain as is nearby down the river valley is excellent for boat building

World War II
In the early hours of June 6, 1944, the U.S. 82nd Airborne and 101st Airborne divisions landed at the base of the Cotentin Peninsula. Although the landings were scattered, they nevertheless secured most of the routes by which the U.S. VII Corps would advance from Utah Beach, the right (west) flank of the Allied forces separated from the landings at Omaha and the other beachheads by the river Douve. The U.S. 4th Infantry Division landed on Utah Beach shortly after dawn with few casualties, and began staging for a move against the fortified port of  Cherbourg, a port critical to future Allied operations.

In the immediate aftermath of the landings, the priority for the Allies at Utah Beach was to link up with the Allied landings further east.  This job was tasked to the 101st Airborne, who had landed in the area and had been conducting raids against inland targets, such as artillery emplacements, and securing and cutting off the area from German reinforcements.

By June 9, the 101st Airborne had reorganized sufficiently from the haphazard scattering of its units. It managed to cross the flooded Douve using a few causeways passing through the flooded fields.  The next day Carentan fell to the 101st in the Battle of Carentan.  Beginning with a dawn assault, it was an all-day, hard-fought, house-to-house fight against German troops embedded in strongly prepared positions. The capture of the town gave the Allies a continuous front joining Omaha to Utah Beach and the other three lodgements to the east of Omaha. Possession of the town was maintained despite a German armor reinforced counterattack just to the south-west of town on the 13th known as the Battle of Bloody Gulch.

On 15 June, engineers of the Ninth Air Force IX Engineering Command began construction of a combat advanced landing ground for fighter aircraft south of the town. Declared operational on 25 June, the airfield was designated as "A-10". It was used by P-47 Thunderbolts of the 50th Fighter Group until mid-August, then as a support airfield for supplies and evacuation of wounded personnel until November when it was closed. Today, a small private airfield is located on part of the wartime facility.

101st Airborne March
The "101st Airborne March" was composed by Daniel Bourdelès, a Norman composer, for the celebration of the liberation of Carentan, in June 1944. This march created in Carentan is extracted from the CD "Carentan, the sky memory" (1994), produced by the town. It is regularly used as a musical illustration for the Normandy liberation films on France3 regional TV.

Heraldry

Twinned towns
  Selby, United Kingdom
  Waldfischbach-Burgalben, Germany
  Hopkinsville, Kentucky, United States (since 2019)

See also
 Battle of Carentan
 Communes of the Manche department
 Crociatonum
 Château de Carentan

References

Former communes of Manche
World War II sites in France